On June 21, 2007 an overloaded Free Airlines Let L-410UVP (registration 9Q-CEU) in Karibu Airways livery crashed shortly after takeoff from Kamina Town (fr:Kamina Ville) for Lubumbashi, Democratic Republic of Congo.  Landing in a swamp east of the unpaved strip, the aircraft came to rest inverted in the water.

Background
Free Airlines and Karibu Airways (also cited as the operator) were both on the List of air carriers banned in the EU. That list now bans "All air carriers certified by the authorities with responsibility for
regulatory oversight of Democratic Republic of Congo (RDC)".

The L-410UVP is only rated for a maximum of 17 passengers, but there were 21 people aboard, including three crew. The aircraft was previously registered as 5R-MGO by the now-defunct Madagascar Flying Services.  It was reported to have previously crashed in southern Sudan in 2005.

Crash
There was one fatality, Mbuyu Mibanga, a deputy in the National Assembly of the Democratic Republic of the Congo.  At least 12 more were injured, including two Congolese doctors working for the World Health Organization and one Engineer working for Vodacom-Congo.,

Aftermath
After another crash occurred in August 2007, the licenses of Karibu Airways and pilot Isaac Besongo were subsequently suspended.

References

Further reading

LET 410 down in Kamina Town, DRC PPRuNe 2007-06-21, accessed 2009-12-03
Karibu Airways Aviation Safety Net re airline, accessed 2009-12-03
Kamina : un mort et 13 blessés, bilan du crash d’un petit porter Radio Okapi (in French) 2007-09-21, accessed 2009-12-03
Malemba Nkulu : réactions après le crash de l’avion de Karibu Airways Radio Okapi (in French) 2007-09-26, accessed 2009-12-03

Free Airlines Let-410 crash
Accidents and incidents involving the Let L-410 Turbolet
Aviation accidents and incidents in the Democratic Republic of the Congo
Free
Free Airlines L-410 crash